Aotearoa New Zealand Festival is a multi-arts biennial festival based in Wellington New Zealand that started in 1986. Previous names are the New Zealand International Festival of the Arts, New Zealand International Arts Festival, New Zealand Arts Festival and New Zealand Festival of the Arts. The festival is produced every two years and runs across three weeks in venues in Wellington City and outreach programmes in the region. The festival features both international and national acts from performing arts and music with a literary programme also.

History 

Aotearoa New Zealand Festival started in 1986 in Wellington, New Zealand. The festival was modelled off the Adelaide Festival in Australia. Amongst the people creating this first festival were arts patrons headed by former Prime Minister Jack Marshall. The Wellington City Council and mayor Ian Lawrence supported the festival and the council has continued to support the festival. The festival made a loss for the first four festivals until in 1994 it turned a profit.

Criticism of the council funding international acts in the first festival spawned an alternative event called Flying Kiwi focusing on local artists which was the genesis of the long running New Zealand Fringe Festival.  

In 2012 looking back at the legacy of the festival, classical music critic John Button stated the festival placed Wellington as the cultural capital of New Zealand.

Wellington also had the Wellington Festival that was held every three years starting in 1959. The Wellington Festival Trust became the New Zealand International Festival of the Arts Trust.

Another National Arts Festival was run by the NZ Student's arts council in 1977 involving, film, publications, happenings, music, dance, theatre, puppetry.

Programme 
A range of dance, theatre, music and outdoor events have been programmed over the years. This is across classical and contemporary includes some free events. The festival includes a literary Writers and Readers festival with Janet Frame one of the participants in 1986.

The programme includes international acts, many not seen before in New Zealand. A small selection is named here to give an indication. The Staatskapelle Berlin State Orchestra played at the first festival in 1986 and was the first overseas orchestra to play in New Zealand in twelve years. Sacred Monsters with dancers Sylvie Guillem and Akram Khan was a hit. The Dragons' Trilogy by Ex Machina (dir. Robert Lepage) in 2008 was notable for the positive reviews and for the five and a half hours length.   

The New Zealand Festival of the Arts also has a commissioning and partnership programme for New Zealand work and has premiered many productions. The playwright Hone Kouka has had three productions premiered at the festival, Waiora (1996), Home Fires (1998) and The Prophet (2004).

There is a literary programme as part of the festival, in 2020 it was expanded to three weeks. The 2022 literary programme was created by Claire Mabey, the director of Verb Festival and LitCrawl Wellington and was online. The programme included talks with Mariana Mazzucato, N K Jemisin, Clementine Ford, Emily Writes and a celebration of 30 years of HUIA publishing with co-founder Robyn Rangihuia Bargh and current directors Brian Morris and Eboni Waitere.

Other parts of the 2022 festival programme were cancelled or scaled down due to Covid-19 public health measures.

Organisation  
  
  
The New Zealand Festival is a charitable trust with a board of trustees and is funded by a number of public and private organisations. These include Creative New Zealand and the Wellington City Council. There are a core staff on a salary and numbers increase in preparation for the festival. 

In 2014 there was a re-organisation and re-branding of an umbrella organisation to Tāwhiri: Festivals and Experiences. Tāwhiri core staff organise and programme the New Zealand Festival of Arts, and also the Wellington Jazz Festival, Lexus Song Quest (formerly the Mobil Song Quest), and Second Unit.

In 2020 the New Zealand Festival of the Arts diverged in its artistic choices by using three curators for programming the three weeks. These people were Lemi Ponifasio, Laurie Anderson and Bret McKenzie.

Festival Directors

References

External links 

 New Zealand Festival of the Arts
 Tāwhiri
 https://archives.victoria.ac.nz/repositories/2/archival_objects/6731

Festivals in Wellington
Arts festivals in New Zealand
Festivals established in 1986
1986 establishments in New Zealand
Theatre festivals in New Zealand
Literary festivals in New Zealand